Gravesend Lifeboat Station is situated on the Royal Terrace Pier in Gravesend, Kent, on the lower reaches of the River Thames. It is one of the newest lifeboat stations operated by the Royal National Lifeboat Institution (RNLI), and one of the first to cover a river rather than the sea or estuarial waters.

Establishment
The inquiry set up after the 1989 collision on the Thames in London between the Marchioness and the dredger Bowbelle, that resulted in the loss of 51 lives, recommended a dedicated search and rescue presence on the Thames. As a part of this, the government approached the RNLI, who agreed to provide a rescue service that covered the tidal Thames between Teddington and the Channel. Locations were approved for stations at Teddington, Chiswick, Tower and Gravesend. These all became operational at the beginning of 2002, with Gravesend covering the river from the Thames Barrier at Woolwich to the western end of Canvey Island, a distance of 26 miles.

History
Gravesend Lifeboat Station commenced service on 2 January 2002, operating with an E-class Tiger Marine fast response boat named Olive Laura Deare.

In June 2007, the station moved to the end of the Royal Terrace Pier, adjacent to the pontoon where the lifeboat is moored. Previously housed in porta-cabins in a near-by car park, this move improved conditions and helped reduce launch times.

Gravesend has one of the highest lifeboat call out rates in Kent, and is among the busiest stations in the British Isles. In the fifteen years to May 2017 its lifeboat launched 1,500 times, rescuing 797 people and saving 69 lives. 

In 2008 a new lifeboat, a B-class (Atlantic 85) named Olive Laura Deare II, was put on service. The original Olive Laura Deare was transferred to the relief fleet until 2012, when she went on display at the RNLI Historic Lifeboat Collection at the Chatham Historic Dockyard. The boats were named after the donor who funded the boats through a legacy.

Crew
Since it was established in January 2002, the Gravesend station has been staffed 24 hours a day on a shift system, helping to meet the requirement to reach 90% of incidents within 15 minutes of receiving an alert. The crew is drawn from both full-time staff and a pool of volunteers.

Boats
Gravesend Lifeboat Station's boats have been:

See also
 Royal National Lifeboat Institution
 List of RNLI stations

References

External links
 Official page of the Gravesend lifeboat at the RNLI website

Piers in Kent
2002 establishments in England
Lifeboat stations in Kent
Gravesend, Kent